Deriba Alemu (born 1983) is an Ethiopian long-distance runner.

International competitions

Personal bests
3000 metres – 8:42.10 (2005)
5000 metres – 15:00.56 (2005)
10,000 metres – 31:04.49 (2004)
Half marathon – 1:10:45 (2003)

External links

1983 births
Living people
Ethiopian male long-distance runners
Ethiopian male cross country runners
21st-century Ethiopian people